The women's 200 metres event at the 1970 British Commonwealth Games was held on 21 and 22 July at the Meadowbank Stadium in Edinburgh, Scotland. It was the first time that the metric distance was contested at the Games replacing the 220 yards event.

Medalists

Results

Heats
Qualification: First 3 in each heat (Q) and the next 1 fastest (q) qualify for the semifinals.

Wind:Heat 1: ? m/s, Heat 2: +5.7 m/s, Heat 3: ? m/s, Heat 4: +1.0 m/s, Heat 5: +8.8 m/s

Semifinals
Qualification: First 4 in each semifinal (Q) qualify directly for the final.

Wind:Heat 1: +3.3 m/s, Heat 2: +3.9 m/s

Final
Held on 22 July

Wind: +4.0 m/s

References

Heats, Semifinals & Final results (p9)
Australian results

Athletics at the 1970 British Commonwealth Games
1970